Hubert Haas (23 August 1919 – 1976) was a Belgian writer known for his work in the Walloon language. He was born in Châtelet. Haas worked with Georges Smal and Jean Guillaume.

1919 births
1976 deaths
People from Châtelet
Belgian writers in Walloon